Central Park Station is a subway station on Line 1 of the Incheon Subway in Jiha240, Incheon-tower-daero, Yeonsu-gu, Incheon, South Korea.

The name of the station is written as "" (most Koreans pronounce itssenteureolpakeu ) in hangul. It should be also "" in mixed script of hangul and hanja, but "" (hangul: , Revised Romanization: Jung-ang-gong-won) is its hanja name.

Station layout

Neighborhood 
 Songdo Central Park
 POSCO E&C Tower
 Incheon City History Museum
 Incheon Bridge Observation Deck
 Incheon Art Center

References

Metro stations in Incheon
Seoul Metropolitan Subway stations
Railway stations opened in 2009
Yeonsu District